Shahsenem (Russian:; Turkmen:) was a medieval settlement located in the Daşoguz region of modern-day Turkmenistan.

References

Former populated places in Turkmenistan